Nazarovskaya is a rural locality (a village) in Beketovskoye Rural Settlement, Vozhegodsky District, Vologda Oblast, Russia. The population was 26 as of 2002.

Geography 
Nazarovskaya is located 45 km northwest of Vozhega (the district's administrative centre) by road. Baranovskaya is the nearest rural locality.

References 

Rural localities in Vozhegodsky District